Chandran Kukathas (born 12 September 1957) is a Malaysian-born Australian political theorist and the author of several books. Until 2019 he was Head of the Department of Government at the London School of Economics, where he held a Chair in Political Theory.

Early life
Chandran Kukathas was born on 12 September 1957 in The Federation of Malaya which later became a part of Malaysia. He obtained a BA in History and Political Science from Australian National University and an MA in Politics from University of New South Wales. He earned his DPhil in Politics from the University of Oxford, where he cofounded the Oxford Hayek Society.

Career
Kukathas has taught at the Australian Defence Force Academy campus of the University of New South Wales, the University of Oxford, and the Australian National University. He was the 1986–87 R.C. Hoiles Postdoctoral Fellow at the Institute for Humane Studies at George Mason University. He was, from 2003–2007, the Neal A. Maxwell Professor of Political Theory, Public Policy and Public Service in the Department of Political Science at the University of Utah. He has held visiting positions at the Social Philosophy and Policy Center, Bowling Green State University (1991) and the Murphy Institute, Tulane University (2003). He has also been a visiting professor in the departments of Political Science and Philosophy at the National University of Singapore.

Kukathas holds a chair in Political Theory in the Department of Government at the London School of Economics. He serves on the advisory board of the Institute of Economic Affairs.

Kukathas supports a radically minimalist form of political liberalism, where there are multiple forms of authority, each of which is legitimate.

Bibliography

References

Australian National University alumni
Academic staff of the Australian National University
Australian political scientists
George Mason University faculty
Academics of the London School of Economics
University of New South Wales alumni
Alumni of the University of Oxford
University of Utah faculty
Living people
1957 births
Australian people of Malaysian descent
Cato Institute people